George Verwer (born July 3, 1938) is an Evangelist and is the founder of Operation Mobilisation (OM), a Christian missions organization. Verwer has written several books on various Christian themes. He is a passionate advocate of radical discipleship as the only legitimate option for people who believe in Jesus. In recent days, he has been working in India (Barathdasham in Telugu) ministered in various languages including Hindi, Telugu and Tamil.  Over a million books he has authored have been distributed worldwide. He preaches in many churches in zoom and is very passionate about spreading the word of God.

Early life
Verwer's first contact with Christianity was through his neighbor, Dorothea Clapp, who gave him the Gospel of John and also put him on her "Holy Ghost hit list". Verwer attributes to her some of the reasons that he made a commitment to Christ, and for what resulted in his life.

In 1953, as a 14-year-old student from Wyckoff, New Jersey attending Ramsey High School, Verwer went to a Jack Wyrtzen meeting in which Billy Graham spoke in Madison Square Garden, in New York City. There he was converted to become a Christian, at the age of 16. Within a year, about 200 of his classmates became Christians.

He had a growing conviction to evangelize on foreign soil. He started with the distribution of the Gospel of John in Mexico in 1957 along with two friends, Walter Borchard and Dale Rhoton. They called this operation "Send the Light". This continued with others during the summer holidays. Afterward, Verwer used the name "Send the Light" for a book distribution operation to India based in the United Kingdom. This developed into Send the Light, which was once the largest Christian book distributor in the United Kingdom, but entered into Administration December 2009 and moved into Liquidation December 2010.

Education
After high school, he attended Maryville College and then transferred to Moody Bible Institute, where he met his wife, Drena, a fellow student.  They have three children.

He was awarded an honorary degree, Doctor of Divinity, during commencement at Biola University on May 22, 2009.

Operation Mobilization

After graduation, they went to Spain. Once while taking Bibles into the USSR, George was arrested and accused of being a spy. He was deported, and back in Spain, after a time of prayer in 1961 the work of Operation Mobilization (OM) was born. George often refers to this calling himself "God's Bungler", in reference to Brother Andrew, "God's Smuggler".

In August 2003, George handed over the international leadership of the work of Operation Mobilisation to Peter Maiden, who was the Associate International Director for 15 years. George and his wife are now involved in Special Projects Ministries full-time, traveling and taking meetings around the world.

Bibliography

Books
 The Fruit of the Spirit, Bangalore: O.M. Fellowship House, n.d.
 Extremism, Bombay: Gospel Literature Service, 1964.
 Pseudo Discipleship, Fort Washington: Christian Literature Crusade, 1970. 
 Come! Live! Die! The Real Revolution, Carol Stream: Tyndale House Publishers, 1972. 
 Hunger For Reality, Kansas City: Walterick Publishers, 1972.
 Literature Evangelism, Send the Light, 1977. 
 No Turning Back, Bromley: Send the Light, 1983. 
 The George Verwer Collection, Milton Keynes: Authentic, 1989.
 The Revolution of Love, Authentic Lifestyle, 1989.  
 Originally published as "Revolution of Love and Balance"
 There is Dynamite in Literature, Pilot Books, 2007. 
 Out Of The Comfort Zone, Bethany House Publishers, 2001.  (Online etext)
 Drops From A Leaking Tap, Authentic, 2008.
 Messiology, Moody Publishers, 2016.  
 Originally published as "More Drops: Mystery, Mercy and Messiology"

Audio Books
There Is A 29th Chapter To Acts, Oasis Audio, 2000. 
If You're Not Called To Stay Then Go!
Lukewarm No More
Straight From The Heart
Failure, Restoration, Forgiveness: Confessions of a Weak Servant

References

External links

George's official website
OM page about its founder

Living people
1938 births
People from Wyckoff, New Jersey
Ramsey High School (New Jersey) alumni
Maryville College alumni
Moody Bible Institute alumni
American Protestant missionaries
Protestant missionaries in Russia
American male writers
Organization founders